Dhanauli is a village in Barabanki district in the state of Uttar Pradesh, India.

Location and composition
Dhanauli is close to Tehsil Haidergarh. The village is divided into three gram panchayats: Dhanauli Khas, Dhanauli Mishraan and Dhanauli Thakuran.

It is a village panchayat in Banikoder Block, Barabanki District. It has five census villages: Dhanauli khas, Purepathak, Puredubey, Purebaniya, Pureitiha.

Dhanauli Misraan
Dhanauli Misraan (or Mishran) is named after the fact that this is mostly populated by the Mishras (The surname being "Mishra"). It is a village panchayat in Banikoder Block, Barabanki District. It has two census villages: Ohar Pur, and Dhanauli Misran.

Dhanauli Thakuran
Dhanauli Thakuran is named after the fact that this is mostly populated by the Thakurs (Thakurs belong to warrior clan).

History
Dhanauli was the subject of media coverage in August 2007 when child workers from the village were rescued from a foam factory in Karnal, Haryana.

Education
Dhanauli has the following schools:
Dhanauli khas
P.S. Dhanauli khas
P.S. Pathkanpur
J.H.S. PurePathak
Dhanauli Misraan
P.S. Oharpur

Notable people
 Ram Sagar Rawat, a local politician and four-time MP (9th, 10th, 11th, 13th Lok Sabha) for the constituency of Barabanki, was born here.

References

External links
Population estimate
Total population map

Villages in Barabanki district